The UR G class, known later as the UR / KUR GA class, and later still as the KUR EB class, was a class of  gauge  steam locomotives built by Nasmyth, Wilson and Company in Patricroft, Salford, England, for the Uganda Railway (UR).

The seven members of the class entered service on the UR in 1914. In 1920, the East Africa Protectorate became the Kenya Crown Colony and was opened for settlement. The UR soon became hard pressed to keep up with the increased movement of goods and produce, and the locomotives in the class were used to address that problem. They continued in service after the UR was renamed the Kenya-Uganda Railway (KUR) in 1926.

See also

Rail transport in Kenya
Rail transport in Uganda

References

Notes

Bibliography

Kenya-Uganda Railway locomotives
Metre gauge steam locomotives
Nasmyth, Wilson and Company locomotives
Railway locomotives introduced in 1914
Steam locomotives of Kenya
Steam locomotives of Uganda
Uganda Railway locomotives
4-8-0 locomotives
Scrapped locomotives